Vrtoče may refer to:

 Vrtoče, Bosanski Petrovac, Federation of Bosnia and Herzegovina, Bosnia and Herzegovina
 Vrtoče (Drvar), Federation of Bosnia and Herzegovina, Bosnia and Herzegovina
 , Republika Srpska, Bosnia and Herzegovina
 Vrtoče, Miren-Kostanjevica, Slovenia